was professor emeritus at Osaka University and Kōnan Women's University, and a noted scholar of Japanese literature and especially the Man'yōshū poetry. He earned his bachelor's degree in Japanese literature from the University of Tokyo in 1932, as well as its Ph.D. in 1962. He received the Order of the Rising Sun, Gold Rays with Neck Ribbon from the Japanese Government in 1978. He was qualified as a Person of Cultural Merit in 1987. Upon his death, the Order of the Sacred Treasure, Gold and Silver Star, was posthumously granted on him.

When he was a professor of Osaka University, he walked around with his students the places where each verse of the Man'yōshū was composed, in order to help them understand the essences of the Man'yōshū more deeply. His idea impressed the students very much, and they went for more than 250 trips all over the country for almost 50 years, until he died in 1998. The total number of participants of those Osaka University Man'yo trips reached more than 40,000. 

In addition to teaching his students, he helped the people be more familiar with the Man'yōshū. Countless of people was attracted by the Man'yōshū thanks to his activities. He gave a lecture on Man'yōshū to Emperor Shōwa on the top of a hill in Asuka, Nara, on December 4, 1979.

References

External links
犬養孝〈Takashi Inukai〉｜NHK Archives 
Western ASUKA Friendship Center,INUKAI MANYO Memorial Hall 

1907 births
1998 deaths
Japanese literature academics
Academic staff of Osaka University
University of Tokyo alumni
Recipients of the Order of the Rising Sun, 3rd class
Recipients of the Order of the Sacred Treasure, 2nd class